Enoplops is a genus of Palaearctic bugs, in the family Coreidae and tribe Coreini.  Species are recorded from Europe and includes E. scapha found in the British Isles; there are also records from North Africa and China.

Species
The Coreoidea Species File lists the following:
 Enoplops bos Dohrn, 1860
 Enoplops disciger (Kolenati, 1845)
 Enoplops eversmanni Jakovlev, 1881
 Enoplops hashemii Hoberlandt, 1989
 Enoplops heintzii (Oshanin, 1871)
 Enoplops potanini (Jakovlev, 1890)
 Enoplops scapha (Fabricius, 1794) - type species
 Enoplops sibiricus Jakovlev, 1889

References

External Links
British Bugs: Enoplops scapha Boat Bug (retrieved 31 October 2021)

Coreidae
Pentatomomorpha genera
Hemiptera of Europe
Hemiptera of Africa